Jeremy Allen Mayfield (born May 27, 1969) is an American stock car racing driver. He drove cars for the Sadler brothers, T.W. Taylor, Cale Yarborough, Michael Kranefuss, Roger Penske, Ray Evernham, Bill Davis, and Gene Haas. In 2009, he drove for his own team, Mayfield Motorsports.

On May 9, 2009, Mayfield was suspended indefinitely as both owner and driver by NASCAR following what NASCAR said was a positive test for methamphetamine.  A federal judge weighed the evidence and temporarily lifted the suspension on July 1, 2009. On July 15, 2009, NASCAR said Mayfield had for the second time tested positive for methamphetamine after failing a random drug test on July 6. On July 24, a federal appeals court overturned the previous injunction Mayfield had been awarded, leaving him suspended from the sport.

Racing career

Beginnings
Mayfield began racing in his hometown of Owensboro, Kentucky, racing BMX bicycles. He then proceeded to race go-karts at local Short tracks; moving to Nashville Speedway USA at the age of 19. He soon went to work for Sadler Brothers Racing as a fabricator, and became their driver, winning Late Model Rookie of the Year at Kentucky Motor Speedway in 1987.

In 1993, he joined the ARCA series, and was named Rookie of the Year.

NASCAR
Mayfield made his Cup debut in the 1993 Mello Yello 500; starting 30th and finishing 29th in the No. 95 Earl Sadler-owned Ford Thunderbird. In 1994, Mayfield declared he would run for NASCAR Winston Cup Series Rookie of the Year, and signed to drive the Sadler Brothers' No. 95 Ford. He resumed his role as that team's sheetmetal man in 1995, and  signed to drive the No. 02 for T.W. Taylor, for four races before completing the year in the No. 98 Fingerhut-sponsored Ford for Cale Yarborough. He ran 20 starts in his inaugural season, his best finish a 19th at Rockingham. In 1995, he stayed with Yarborough full-time, and had an eighth-place run at the Miller Genuine Draft 500, with a 31st-place finish in the points standings after qualifying for 27 out of 31 races. The next season, he had two top-fives and earned his first career pole at the DieHard 500 Later that season, he and John Andretti of the No. 37 Ford owned by Michael Kranefuss and Carl Haas, negotiated to begin their next year's contracts (in each other's then rides) early. Mayfield ended the year 26th in points.

Mayfield formally joined the Kranefuss-Haas team in 1997. He had eight top tens, including two fifth-place runs, and finished a then career-high 13th place in points. After the season, Carl Haas' interests in the team were sold to Penske Racing South, and the team's identity was changed, with a new number (No. 12). Mayfield took the points lead early in the season, and won his first career race at the Pocono 500. At the end of the season, he ranked a career best seventh in the point standings, with 1 win, 12 top five finishes, 16 top 10 finishes, and a pole. In 1999, he dropped four spots in the standings, despite twelve top-tens. In 2000, he won four poles and two races. Mayfield's 3rd Cup series win and his 2nd of 2000 is probably the most famous of all his wins, as he bumped Dale Earnhardt out of the lead in the last turn and then used Earnhardt's famous "Rattle his cage" line against Earnhardt in victory lane.

One of the poles, however, was at the DieHard 500, and the car was found to have violated the rules and penalties resulted in the team earning -25 points from the race (his 126 points, earned by finishing 14th and leading a lap, were offset by the 151-point penalty NASCAR handed down). Later, while practicing for the Brickyard 400, he crashed hard into the wall. He suffered a concussion and was forced to miss the next two races. He finished 24th in points that season as a result of also having eleven DNFs (including six in a row).

He began 2001 with two consecutive third-place finishes, but was released after the Protection One 400. Rumors circulated around the garage that he had burned bridges with Roger Penske in order to sign a new deal with Ray Evernham's team. Rusty Wallace added the next year, that he did not see head to head with Jeremy Mayfield as teammates and that they feuded several times. He later provided Jeremy Mayfield with a driving contract in Wallace's lower-tier team in 2005 as a sign of his regret.

In 2002, Mayfield signed to Evernham Motorsports, replacing Casey Atwood. In his first year, Mayfield had four top-tens and finished 26th in points. He improved in 2003, winning the pole at the Aaron's 499 and posting 12 top-tens, finishing nineteenth in points. In 2004, Mayfield returned to victory lane at the Chevy Rock and Roll 400 to move his team into the ninth spot in the inaugural Chase for the Cup, and finished tenth in points. For a while, winning a race to get into the Chase was referred by the moniker "pulling a Jeremy Mayfield." In 2005, he won the GFS Marketplace 400, and finished ninth in the standings. In August 2006 he was released from Evernham (see below). Evernham used Bill Elliott and then Elliott Sadler for the remainder of the season.

Mayfield signed a contract with Bill Davis Racing for 2007, driving the No. 36 Toyota Camry. He ran a total of 13 races for Bill Davis Racing in 32 attempts with a best finish of 22nd at Kansas Speedway. In August 2007, it was announced that Mayfield and Davis would part ways at the end of the season.

Later in the season, he would take over driving the No. 66 car for Haas CNC Racing (then wholly owned by Gene Haas, no relation to Carl Haas, above) starting with Atlanta 2007. Late in 2007, he and teammate Scott Riggs would switch rides putting Mayfield in the No. 70 car (later to become the Stewart-Haas No. 14 car) at the beginning the 2008 season.

Mayfield completed seven races in the No. 70 with a best finish of sixteenth before he was released from the team. After July 9, 2008, Tony Stewart was able to announce his purchase into the Haas CNC team and the lineup of drivers to replace Riggs and Mayfield.

Mayfield would complete one additional race at Dover in the No. 40 Dodge, filling in for the injured Dario Franchitti. He would start tenth and finish twenty-fifth.

After failing to get a ride for the 2009 season, on January 19, 2009, Mayfield and his wife announced that he started his own team, Mayfield Motorsports. Mayfield would attempt the full season in a self-owned Toyota, using the number 41 (the number and owner points was purchased from Chip Ganassi Racing) and borrowing the Evernham-style of numbering. He raced his way into the Daytona 500 successfully. After ten races in the 2009 season, Mayfield qualified for just five. He was then embroiled in a substance abuse dispute that, for all intents and purposes, ended his NASCAR career. By July 2009, Mayfield had sold his race team and operations due to lack of sponsorship, and all members of the race team either resigned or were laid off.

During his NASCAR career, Mayfield had 36 career Busch Series starts. He had five top tens, his best finish being a fourth at Rockingham in 2003. He also had three Craftsman Truck Series starts, with a best finish of 6th at the 2003 Hardee's 200 for Green Light Racing. After his release from Evernham in 2006, he drove for Billy Ballew Motorsports in a pair of truck races.

Life after NASCAR
Mayfield was working as a delivery person while waiting for word on his appeals.  By 2011, tax officials in Catawba County, North Carolina were on the verge of foreclosing on Mayfield's 388-acre spread there because he owed $82,000 in back taxes. In 2012, Mayfield was evicted from his home and was planned to drive in the ARCA series for Carter 2 Motorsports, although this deal fell through. On January 6, 2014, Mayfield was convicted on two counts of possession of drug paraphernalia and one count for possessing stolen items, receiving 18 months of unsupervised probation, and was ordered to pay $88,124.41, adding an extra $1,100 in court costs.

Mayfield currently races in the KOMA Unwind Modified Madness Tour, making his debut in the series' inaugural race at Hickory Motor Speedway. In May 2014, Mayfield released a video, titled The Mayfield Story, to explain the substance abuse controversy from his point of view.

In July 2014, Mayfield returned to organized racing competition, driving in a Pro Cup Series event at Tri-County Motor Speedway and finishing seventh of the ten cars that started. On September 29, 2014, Mayfield announced he would compete full-time in dirt and Super Late Model racing for 2015. On October 8, 2014, Mayfield started a Dirt Late Model team with plans to compete full-time in the World of Outlaws, with Mayfield as driver of the J2 car and Aaron Thomas as owner; former Charlotte Motor Speedway president Humpy Wheeler is an assistant for Mayfield.

He currently competes around the northwest of the state of Georgia at local dirt tracks.

He earned his first career Late Model win on November 26, 2018, at Lavonia Speedway, which was his first race win in any division of motorsports, since his final Cup victory of his racing career in 2005. Afterwards, an emotional Mayfield called it the "biggest win of my life."

“It feels great to get these guys into victory lane,” said Mayfield afterwards. “We’ve come close several times, and finally we get to snap that win drought. These guys put a great car under me today, and I couldn’t be happier.”

As of 2020, Mayfield has mended his bridges with Ray Evernham and has shown an interest as a possible participant in the Superstar Racing Experience (SRX) series created by Evernham and Tony Stewart.

Personal life
He currently lives in Denver, North Carolina.

Controversies

Release from Evernham Motorsports
On August 8, 2006, Mayfield learned through NASCAR.com that he was not placed onto the entry list for Watkins Glen, instead replaced by former Evernham driver Bill Elliott. The No. 19 team falling out of the top 35 in points was initially given as the reason for Mayfield's release. Evernham later confirmed that Mayfield had been released from his contract after making comments about Evernham not being at the track often. Mayfield later stated that the problems with the 19 car stemmed from lack of attention from the team owner due to a "close personal relationship" with developmental driver Erin Crocker. Mayfield stated that Evernham was not with the Cup cars most weeks because of the extensive attention that he was giving Crocker and her No. 98 truck team. Evernham later admitted that he was seriously involved in an affair with Crocker, whom he married in 2009.

Substance abuse violation
On May 9, 2009, Mayfield was suspended indefinitely by NASCAR for violating NASCAR's substance abuse policy. Owing to NASCAR policy, Dr. David Black, whose company (Aegis Sciences Corporation) oversees NASCAR's testing program, refused to specify the substance for which Mayfield tested positive, instead saying it was "a drug of concern."

Mayfield stated: "I believe that the combination of a prescribed medicine and an over the counter medicine reacted together and resulted in a positive drug test. My doctor and I are working with both NASCAR consultant Dr. David Black and NASCAR to resolve this matter."

Dr. Black disputed Mayfield's claims, stating: "What we have is a clear violation of policy. In my many years of experience, I have never seen a violation like this due to the combination of over-the-counter or prescription products."

However, the week after his suspension, Mayfield stated that he had only taken two tablets of Claritin-D and the prescription drug Adderall, which he stated was prescribed to assist his attention deficit disorder, and that he had never used any sort of illegal drug. His wife, family, friends, fans, crew chief and other team members, drug store receipts, and signed prescription from his care provider backed these claims.

Afterwards, criticism of NASCAR's testing policy became rampant, and several suggested that NASCAR's secrecy over Mayfield's results was politically motivated, so as to not smear the reputation of Claritin, who was a sponsor of Carl Edwards and NASCAR on Fox at the time.

For the Coca-Cola 600 and Sprint All-Star Race Mayfield Motorsports named former Hall of Fame Racing team driver J. J. Yeley as interim driver and Jeremy's wife Shana as the interim owner.

On June 9, 2009, ESPN.com stated that during the random drug screening on May 1 at Richmond International Raceway, Mayfield tested positive for methamphetamine.

A doctor from Florida stated that it was impossible for Mayfield to use the levels of methamphetamine NASCAR claimed he did, or else he would be dead or a chronic user. According to another medical professional in Central Florida, the combination of medications cited by Mayfield has a 15% chance of a false positive being obtained.

On July 1, 2009, US District Court Judge Graham Mullen granted a temporary injunction, lifting Mayfield's suspension. Mullen concluded that the "likelihood of a false positive in this case is quite substantial." In granting the injunction, Mullen ruled that the "harm to Mr. Mayfield significantly outweighs the harm to NASCAR".  Even with the injunction, Mayfield was forced to sit out the Coke Zero 400 and LifeLock.com 400 for want of a sponsor.

On July 15, 2009, NASCAR stated that Mayfield had again tested positive for methamphetamine during testing conducted outside of a NASCAR event, at and by entering Jeremy Mayfield's home on July 6, five days after his suspension was lifted. Mayfield continued to deny ever using the drug, and to account for the results by proper use of the OTC drug Claritin D combined with prescription treatment including Adderall. Additionally, Mayfield took a drug test 40 minutes after NASCAR's, this time administered by and at a certified drug-testing laboratory not affiliated with NASCAR, and it was negative.

Lisa Mayfield, the widow of Jeremy Mayfield's father, stated that she was his mother and had seen him use methamphetamines many times since 1998. Jeremy Mayfield rejected these allegations; refuting statements cited the inability for Lisa to have adopted an adult, and adoption being a condition for the claimed relationship. Lisa Mayfield later trespassed on Jeremy's property and assaulted persons whom she found there, resulting in the arrest of Lisa Mayfield. The disputes were settled out of court, and Lisa Mayfield withdrew her claims concerning Jeremy Mayfield.

A federal appeals court reversed Mayfield's injunction on July 24, 2009. On May 18, 2010, Mullen threw out Mayfield's suit, saying that Mayfield waived his right to sue NASCAR for defamation, when he agreed to take part in NASCAR events. Accounts and documents submitted for the case  between the two dates, are public record and can be found on PACER.

Mayfield could theoretically return to NASCAR if he completes NASCAR's "Road to Recovery" treatment program and submits to drug testing with a non-WADA-approved lab belonging to Black, the only lab accepted by NASCAR at the time (NASCAR has since replaced their approved drug testing lab in 2017). On the January 8, 2013 episode of the MRN radio show NASCAR Live, hosted by Eli Gold, then-NASCAR CEO Brian France alluded to other options (in addition to the documented "Road to Recovery" plan) that had previously been discussed outside of public knowledge, when Mayfield reached him; these options were not clarified publicly. On the show France continued with statements that Mayfield must follow examples of other re-instated drivers that, as of June 28, 2016, are not participants in NASCAR. Mayfield is adamant about his innocence from NASCAR's charges. In an interview with Sporting News in 2014, Mayfield said he was willing to take a drug test "as long as I can pee in a cup for LabCorp or some other credible lab."

Dog attack
On April 22, 2011, five dogs owned by Mayfield attacked a mail carrier who drove through the entrance gate past "Beware of Dogs" signs to deliver a package too large for the roadside mailbox. She received several scratches and bite marks on her legs. The dogs were immediately taken, then euthanized. On May 10, 2012, Mayfield was ordered to pay $1 million in the lawsuit of the dog attacks after failing to respond to a lawsuit.

2011 arrest
On November 1, 2011, sheriff's deputies searched Mayfield's home in Catawba based on an informant's statement that Mayfield and four accomplices were staging burglaries to support Mayfield's methamphetamine habit. Mayfield was taken into custody after deputies claimed to find 1.5 grams of meth residue on a plastic bag in a gun safe.

Authorities later found $100,000 worth of stolen goods on a little-used area of Mayfield's property. Among the recovered items were heavy machinery that had been reported stolen from two businesses in neighboring Lincoln County in late 2010 and early 2011, as well as audiovisual equipment that was later reported stolen from the then-defunct Red Bull Racing Team in nearby Mooresville in February 2011.

The informant whose statement led to the original search, died with his passenger in 2012 in a motorcycle crash while evading police pursuit in the jurisdiction of a different law enforcement agency.

Almost all the charges were eventually dropped or thrown out, with Mayfield pleading to two counts of misdemeanor possession of stolen property and one count possession of drug paraphernalia in 2014.

In popular media
Mayfield is featured in the video for "Drowning (Face Down)" by the band Saving Abel. He was also featured in Alan Jackson's 1997 music video "Who's Cheatin' Who". And, in 2004, Mayfield participated in a Family Feud NASCAR special, hosted by then-host Richard Karn. In the special, Mayfield and his Evernham team faced off against Kevin Harvick on behalf of both drivers' foundations, with Mayfield and his team winning the game.

Motorsports career results

NASCAR
(key) (Bold – Pole position awarded by qualifying time. Italics – Pole position earned by points standings or practice time. * – Most laps led.)

Sprint Cup Series

Daytona 500

Busch Series

Craftsman Truck Series

ARCA Hooters SuperCar Series
(key) (Bold – Pole position awarded by qualifying time. Italics – Pole position earned by points standings or practice time. * – Most laps led.)

See also
 List of NASCAR Sprint All-Star Race drivers
 List of people from Kentucky

References

External links

 
 

1969 births
Living people
American sportspeople in doping cases
Doping cases in auto racing
NASCAR controversies
NASCAR drivers
Sportspeople from Owensboro, Kentucky
Racing drivers from Owensboro, Kentucky
Racing drivers from Kentucky
People from Catawba, North Carolina
NASCAR team owners
Team Penske drivers
Evernham Motorsports drivers
Stewart-Haas Racing drivers
Chip Ganassi Racing drivers